Bahlolzai is Pashtun tribe in Pakistan. Bahlolzai is considered a clan of the Mahsud tribe. They live in Mahsud area in south Waziristan.

Distribution
The center of Mehsud tribe's population is the Makeen-Laddah-Tiarza-Sarwakai belt in South Waziristan. However, Mehsuds also live in Dera Ismail Khan and Tank. 

The Mehsuds are divided into Four main clans (famously known as the "Dre-Maseed" meaning four " Mehsuds) i.e.
 Shaman Khel
 Bahlolzai
 Alizai

References

 

Social groups of Pakistan
Karlani Pashtun tribes